Clabon Walter (Cla) Allen FRAS, (28 December 1904 – 11 December 1987) was an Australian astronomer, director of the University of London Observatory and author of Astrophysical Quantities.

Allen was born at Subiaco, Perth the third child of James Bernard Allen (died 1912), a South Australian-born lecturer in physics at Perth Technical School, and his wife Alice Hooper, née Aitken, a New Zealand-born trained nurse. Cla (as he was known) was educated at the High School, Perth, Western Australia and the University of Western Australia (B.Sc., 1926; M.Sc., 1929; D.Sc., 1936). Allen was appointed to a research fellowship at the newly established Commonwealth Solar Observatory in 1926 at Mount Stromlo, Australian Capital Territory, becoming an assistant there in 1928.

Allen observed the 1 October 1940 solar eclipse in South Africa and obtained important results on the solar corona, including measurements of its electron density which were to prove invaluable to radio astronomers.

Allen accepted an invitation by Sir Harrie Massey in 1951 to become Perren professor of astronomy at University College, London, and director of the University of London Observatory, Mill Hill. Within a few years Allen had built up his observatory into one of the best astronomical departments in England. He published the first edition of Astrophysical Quantities in 1955, a compilation of numerical data of astrophysical interest. Universally known as "AQ", it is the most quoted book on the subject.

References

External links
Allen, Clabon Walter (1904–1987) at Encyclopedia of Australian Science
Interview with Clabon Allen, Professor of Astronomy / Interviewer: Amy MacGrath. (sound recording) at Trove, National Library of Australia

1904 births
1987 deaths
20th-century Australian astronomers
Fellows of the Royal Astronomical Society
Academics of University College London
University of Western Australia alumni